SS Hope was a hospital ship operated by Project HOPE. This vessel was originally a US Navy hospital ship, .  Consolation was donated to Project Hope in 1958, and under its new name served from 1960 until 1974, when she was retired. Hope was not replaced, and the emphasis of Project HOPE switched entirely to land-based operations. The project was founded by William B. Walsh.

List of voyages
While in charitable service from 1960 to 1974, this ship voyaged around the world:

Voyage 1, to Indonesia and South Vietnam, September 1960 – September 1961
Voyage 2, to Peru, May 1962 – March 1963
Voyage 3, to Ecuador, November 1963 – September 1964
Voyage 4, to Guinea, September 1964 – September 1965
Voyage 5, to Nicaragua, January 1966 – November 1966
Voyage 6, to Colombia, February 1967 – December 1967
Voyage 7, to Ceylon (Sri Lanka), February 1968 – March 1969
Voyage 8, to Tunisia, August 1969 – August 1970
Voyage 9, to the West Indies, January 1971 – November 1971
Voyages 10 and 11, to Brazil, February 1972 – March 1974

Features
One special piece of equipment was a machine called the Iron Cow. Using distilled seawater, combined with milk solids and butterfat, it was capable of turning out 1,000 gallons of milk daily.

This 15,000-ton ship had a pharmacy, three operating rooms, a radiology department, an isolation ward, and closed-circuit television for viewing operations. The medical crew typically consisted of 150 nurses and 100 doctors, who taught American practices in various medical specialties, to colleagues around the world.

See also
 Margaret Storkan

References

Further reading

Hospital ships of the United States Navy